Nthati Moshesh (born 28 August 1969) is a South African actress. She was nominated as Africa Movie Academy Award for Best Actress in a Supporting Role in 2016.

Career 
Speaking to ENCA on her film and television preferences, she explained that she isn't critical about the televised medium being used, as long as the message is being passed across. She has acted in the tv series Soldier Soldier and Home Affairs and the TV mini-series Human Cargo. However, she stated that film sets requires more sophistication, and she prefers the technicalities that comes with it. In 2014, she was reported to be one of the cast in Saint and Sinners soap, which airs on Mzansi Magic. In 2015, she acted in Ayanda, which opened the 36th Durban International Film Festival. She also got her first AMAA best actress nomination for her role in the film. In 2016, she won the best actress in a lead role award at 2016 South African Film and Television Awards.
In an article from April 2019, she talks about her struggles over the last year not working for eight months but now she is back on screen as the no-nonsense cult leader, Masabatha, on hit prison drama, Lockdown.

Selected filmography
Cape of Good Hope
Whiskey Echo
Beat the Drum
Kini and Adams
The Long Run
Ayanda|

Selected series

Savage Beauty

Personal life 
Following the death of fellow actress, Mary Makgatho, she acknowledged the impact of the actress in the industry. She is reported as being one of the first black graduates in Performing Arts from Technikon Natal.

References

External links 
 

1969 births
Living people
South African film actresses
South African television actresses
South African soap opera actresses
20th-century South African actresses
21st-century South African actresses